The 2009 German Figure Skating Championships took place on December 18–21, 2008 at the Eissportzentrum Oberstdorf in Oberstdorf. Skaters competed in the disciplines of men's singles, ladies' singles, pair skating, ice dancing, and synchronized skating on the senior, junior, and novice levels.

Medalists

Senior

Junior

Novice

Senior results

Men

Ladies

Pairs

Ice dancing

Synchronized

Junior results

Men

Ladies

Pairs

Ice dancing

Synchronized

Novice results

Pairs

Ice dancing

Synchronized

External links

 2009 German Championships: Senior, junior, novice pairs, novice ice dancing, and novice synchronized results
 2009 German Championships: Youth and novice singles results

German Figure Skating Championships
German Figure Skating Championships
Figure skating